Kiğı District is a district of Bingöl Province in Turkey. The town of Kiğı is the seat and the district had a population of 4,801 in 2021.

Composition 
Beside the town of Kiğı, the district encompasses twenty-nine villages and fifty-eight hamlets.

 Açıkgüney
 Ağaçöven
 Alagöz
 Aşağıserinyer
 Baklalı
 Billice
 Çanakçı
 Çiçektepe
 Çomak
 Dallıca
 Darköprü
 Demirdöş
 Demirkanat
 Duranlar
 Eskikavak
 Eşme
 Güneyağıl
 İlbeyi
 Kadıköy
 Kuşçimeni
 Kutluca
 Nacaklı
 Ölmez
 Sabırtaşı
 Sırmaçek
 Tekbaş
 Topraklık
 Yazgünü
 Yukarıserinyer

References 

Districts of Bingöl Province
Kiğı District